The 2014 FIBA Women's European Championship for Small Countries was the 13th edition of this competition. The tournament took place in Sankt Pölten, Austria, from 14 to 19 July 2014. Austria women's national basketball team won the tournament for the fifth time.

Participating teams

First round
In the first round, the teams were drawn into two groups. The first two teams from each group advance to the semifinals, the other teams will play in the 5th–7th place classification.

Group A

Group B

5th–7th place classification

Group C

Playoffs

Semifinals

3rd place match

Final

Final standings

References

FIBA Women's European Championship for Small Countries
Small Countries
International sports competitions hosted by Austria
Basketball in Austria
2014 in Austrian sport
July 2014 sports events in Europe